Eliyahou Harari is an Israeli-American business executive best known for being the co-founder of SanDisk along with Sanjay Mehrotra.

Early life and education 

He was born in 1945 in Tel Aviv, Israel. His parents were Polish Jews who at 1933 had immigrated to Palestine before Israel's formation.

He was born and raised in the state of Israel. He completed his Bachelor's Degree at Manchester University in England. He completed his Master's degree in Physics at Princeton University and his subject of study was semiconductors.

Career

Hughes Aircraft 

As an engineering intern at Hughes Aircraft, he played a major role in the development of the world's first EEPROM.

Intel 

His very first job after graduating university was at Intel. He later went on to work for a number of startups including Synertek, Wafer Scale Integration and San Disk.

SanDisk 

He founded SanDisk in 1988 along with Sanjay Mehrotra.

Awards and recognition 

He has more than 180 patents. He has received numerous awards including:

 2006 IEEE Reynold B. Johnson Data Storage Device Technology Award
 2009 Robert N. Noyce Medal
 2014 National Medal of Technology
 He has been inducted into the National Inventors Hall of Fame

References

Living people
American chief executives of Fortune 500 companies
SanDisk
Western Digital people
American technology chief executives
20th-century American businesspeople
21st-century American businesspeople
American computer businesspeople
American chief executives
Chief executives in the technology industry
1945 births